Morbid: A True Crime Podcast is an American true crime anthology podcast hosted by Alaina Urquhart and Ash Kelley. Urquhart is an autopsy technician/author and Kelley is a hairdresser. They joined forces and became the duo of true crime podcast superstars they are today. Urquhart is Kelley's aunt, but the two often refer to each other as "sisters". The podcast premiered on May 1, 2018. Morbid has been included on best-of lists by Erie Reader, Vogue, The Post, and Bleeding Cool. 

In 2022 Urquhart and Kelley started a podcast network called "Morbid Network" under the umbrella of the Wondery podcast network. Five podcasts exist under the production of the Morbid Network: Cult Liter with Spencer Henry, That's Spooky, Seven Deadly Sinners, Scream!, and The Strange and Unusual Podcast. 

Aside from Morbid, from November 2021 to June 2022, Urquhart and Kelly also hosted a podcast in partnership with Parcast called "Crime Countdown". 

Urquhart published her first novel, The Butcher and the Wren, debuting in September 2022 through independent publisher Zando. 

Morbid: A True Crime Podcast is currently ranked in the top 20 podcasts in the United States on Spotify and Apple Podcasts as of February 20, 2023.

List of episodes and topics 

*Episode has since been removed from Spotify

Notes on Removed Episodes:
 Episode 31 "The Los Feliz Murder House" was removed and re-done as episode 221.
 Episode 36 "Tyler Hadley" was removed and re-done as episode 226.
 Episode 183 was removed from most platforms after controversy surrounding the apparently deliberate misgendering of the perpetrator who is trans. Kelley, whose partner is trans, offered an apology shortly after.

See also 
 List of American crime podcasts

References

External links 
 

Audio podcasts
Crime podcasts
2018 podcast debuts
American podcasts